The Florida Project is a 2017 American drama film directed by Sean Baker and written by Baker and Chris Bergoch. It stars Brooklynn Prince, Willem Dafoe, Bria Vinaite, Valeria Cotto, Christopher Rivera, and Caleb Landry Jones. The plot follows a six-year-old girl living with her rebellious mother in a motel in Kissimmee, Florida (outside Orlando) as they try to stay out of trouble and make ends meet. The Florida Project premiered in the Directors' Fortnight section of the 2017 Cannes Film Festival, and was theatrically released in the United States on October 6, 2017, by A24.

On review aggregator website Rotten Tomatoes, The Florida Project has an approval rating of 96% based on 254 reviews. On Metacritic, the film holds a weighted average score of 92 out of 100, based on 44 critics, indicating "universal acclaim".

For his role, Willem Dafoe was nominated for Best Supporting Actor at the 90th Academy Awards, and was likewise nominated for Best Supporting Actor – Motion Picture at the 75th Golden Globe Awards.  At the 23rd Critics' Choice Awards, the film was nominated for three awards, winning Best Young Performer for Prince. In addition, it was selected as one of the top ten films of the year by the American Film Institute and the National Board of Review.

Awards and nominations

Notes

References

External links 
 

Florida Project